Ernesto "Neto" Escobedo III (born July 4, 1996) is a Mexican-American professional tennis player who has won four ATP Challenger titles. He is currently the No. 1 Mexican player.

Personal life
Escobedo began playing tennis at the age of 4. His father Ernesto Jr. briefly played professional tennis, and his aunt Xóchitl Escobedo was a Top 300 player who competed in the 1988 Olympics. He is of Mexican descent. Escobedo's cousin Emilio Nava is also a professional tennis player.

Career

2016: Major debut & first win at the US Open, multiple Challenger titles, Top 200

Escobedo reached his first ATP Challenger final at São Paulo in April 2016 to advance him to a career-high ranking inside the top 300. With that success, he became the seventh American teenager to reach a Challenger final in the previous seven months.

He won his first career ATP match at the Aegon Open in Nottingham against top 100 player Diego Schwartzman shortly before turning 20 years old. The next month, he won his first Challenger title at Lexington over fellow up-and-coming American Frances Tiafoe. With this victory, he also won the 2016 US Open Wild Card Challenge to earn a wildcard into the main draw of the final Grand Slam of the year. Escobedo put this wildcard to good use by defeating Lukáš Lacko in the first round to crack the Top 200 for the first time and record his first career Grand Slam match win.

Towards the end of the season, Escobedo returned to Monterrey where he had made the semifinals the previous year, and defended his points by winning the title over Denis Kudla.

2017: Australian Open second round, Masters 1000 debut, Top 100

To start the year, Escobedo continued to improve upon his success from 2016. He qualified for the Australian Open and then won his first round match against fellow NextGen player Daniil Medvedev. 

The following month, he was awarded a wildcard into the Abierto Mexicano Telcel, an ATP 500 event in Acapulco. At this tournament, he again won first round match over fellow American Stefan Kozlov.

In March, Escobedo was able to qualify for his first Masters event at the 2017 Miami Open, where he upset No. 43 Dan Evans to break through into the top 100 of the ATP rankings. To start the clay court season, Escobedo played at the U.S. Men's Clay Court Championships in Houston and reached his first career ATP quarterfinal and semifinal, climbing to a then career-high ranking of No. 73 with this success. His tournament was highlighted by a quarterfinal win over No. 2 seed and fellow American John Isner.

Escobedo was part of the NextGen players that included many fellow Americans such as Frances Tiafoe and Taylor Fritz who were considered the best young prospects to become the next generation of tennis stars.

2018: First top 10 and Masters wins
In February, Escobedo was able to qualify for the Abierto Mexicano Telcel in Acapulco. He defeated top-ranked American Jack Sock in the first round for his first Top 10 win, continuing his success at tournaments in Mexico. In March, Escobedo was given a wildcard for the first time to the main draw of the 2018 Indian Wells Masters where he defeated compatriot Frances Tiafoe, before falling to the 28th seed Feliciano López.

2020–2021: Return to U.S. Open second round in 4 years & to Masters in 3 years
After the suspension of the 2020 season due to COVID, Escobedo returned to the 2020 US Open as an alternate, where he defeated Kamil Majchrzak  in the first round.

In March 2021, Escobedo qualified for the 2021 Miami Open and defeated Paolo Lorenzi in the first round before losing to 16th seed Dušan Lajović.

2022: Fourth Challenger title
Escobedo won the title at the 2022 Bendigo International Challenger in Australia, his first in three years.
He entered the 2022 Australian Open as a lucky loser.

2023: Representing Mexico as No. 1 Mexican player
In January of 2023, Escobedo stopped representing the United States in favor of representing Mexico in tournaments and became the Mexican No. 1 player. He qualified for the 2023 Australian Open. 

He received a wildcard for the qualifying draw of the 2023 Abierto Mexicano Telcel in Acapulco but lost to Brandon Holt.

ATP Challenger and ITF Futures finals

Singles: 11 (4–7)

Doubles: 1 (1–0)

Singles performance timeline

Current through the 2023 Australian Open.

Record against other players

Record against top 10 players
Escobedo's match record against those who have been ranked in the top 10. Players who have been No. 1 are in boldface.

 John Isner 1–0
 Daniil Medvedev 1–0
 Denis Shapovalov 1–0
 Jack Sock 1–0
 Diego Schwartzman 1–1
 Kevin Anderson 0–1
 David Ferrer 0–1
 Tommy Haas 0–1
 Cameron Norrie 0–1
 Fernando Verdasco 0–2

* .

Wins over top 10 players

References

External links
 
 

1996 births
Living people
American male tennis players
Tennis players from Los Angeles
People from West Covina, California
American sportspeople of Mexican descent